Salovaara is a Finnish surname.

Geographical distribution
As of 2014, 92.0% of all known bearers of the surname Salovaara were residents of Finland (frequency 1:3,857), 3.1% of Sweden (1:205,141), 1.6% of Canada (1:1,471,920) and 1.4% of the United States (1:16,420,513).

In Finland, the frequency of the surname was higher than national average (1:3,857) in the following regions:
 1. Kymenlaakso (1:1,920)
 2. Pirkanmaa (1:2,702)
 3. Uusimaa (1:2,773)
 4. South Ostrobothnia (1:2,836)
 5. Päijänne Tavastia (1:3,196)
 6. Southwest Finland (1:3,653)
 7. Satakunta (1:3,745)

People
Aarne Salovaara (1887–1945), Finnish gymnast and track and field athlete
Barry Salovaara (born 1948), Canadian ice hockey player
Juhani Salovaara (born 1931), Finnish sailor

References

Finnish-language surnames